Death Cab for Cutie is an American rock band formed in Bellingham, Washington, in 1997. The band is currently composed of Ben Gibbard (vocals, guitar, piano), Nick Harmer (bass), Dave Depper (guitar, keyboards, backing vocals), Zac Rae (keyboards, guitar), and Jason McGerr (drums).

The band was originally a solo project by Gibbard, who expanded the project into a complete group upon getting a record deal. They released their debut album, Something About Airplanes, in 1998. The band's fourth album, 2003's Transatlanticism, broke into the mainstream both critically and commercially; its songs were featured in various TV series and films. The band's major label debut for Atlantic Records, 2005's Plans, went platinum. The band's tenth and latest studio album, Asphalt Meadows, was released on September 16, 2022. Death Cab for Cutie's music has been classified as indie rock, indie pop, and alternative rock. Alongside their ten full-length studio albums, the band has released four EPs, two live EPs, one live album, and one demo album.

History

Early years (1997–2002) 
Death Cab for Cutie, the name deriving from the Vivian Stanshall/Neil Innes song "Death Cab For Cutie", began in 1997 as a solo project by Ben Gibbard when he was a guitarist for the band Pinwheel. He recorded under the name All-Time Quarterback. As Death Cab for Cutie, he released a cassette, You Can Play These Songs with Chords, during the same year. The release was surprisingly successful, and he decided to expand the project into a band, hiring Chris Walla (who worked on the cassette) on guitar, Nick Harmer on bass guitar, and Nathan Good on drums. Death Cab for Cutie was formed at Western Washington University in Bellingham, Washington. Lyrics from early songs include local references that were important to the band's development. Many of the early songs were recorded in the basement of a house on Ellis Street in which Gibbard lived with several roommates.

The four released their debut album, Something About Airplanes, on August 18, 1998. In 1998, the band met their manager, Jordan Kurland. Kurland had heard the band praised, and after a failed attempt to see them perform at South by Southwest he met them while touring with a client.

The band released We Have the Facts and We're Voting Yes in March 2000. Nathan Good left the band during the making of the album and was replaced briefly by Jayson Tolzdorf-Larson. Gibbard played drums on the majority of the album, with Good's playing on "The Employment Pages" and "Company Calls Epilogue" kept on the final release. Although Tolzdorf-Larson did not contribute to the album, he did appear on the song "Spring Break Broke" from the "Death Cab for Fiver" 7-inch record. He also joined the band on two tours, including their first full tour of the United States. Tolzdorf-Larson was later replaced by Michael Schorr, who would first appear on The Forbidden Love EP, released on October 24, 2000.

In 2001, Death Cab for Cutie released their third album, The Photo Album. Limited editions of this album contained three bonus tracks, which were later released separately as The Stability EP. The album produced the band's first charting single, "A Movie Script Ending", which reached number 123 on the UK Singles Chart, and was the first of three songs by the band to be used on the television show The O.C. "I Was a Kaleidoscope" and "We Laugh Indoors" reached numbers 115 and 122 on the UK Singles Chart, respectively.

Transatlanticism (2003)

In 2003 there was yet another change of drummer with Jason McGerr, who had previously played in the band Eureka Farm with Gibbard and Harmer, joining the band. McGerr's debut came with the band's next release, their fourth album Transatlanticism, which was released in October 2003. The album received critical acclaim and launched the band into mainstream commercial success, with the two singles "The Sound of Settling" and "Title and Registration", appearing in the soundtracks of the television shows The O.C., Six Feet Under, CSI: Miami and Californication, and the films Wedding Crashers, Easy A, and Mean Creek. A tenth-anniversary version containing demos and outtakes was released in 2013.

Signing to Atlantic and Plans (2004–2006) 

In early 2004, the band recorded a live EP, entitled The John Byrd EP, named for their sound engineer. It was released on Barsuk Records in March.

Death Cab for Cutie had been contacted by major labels on-and-off for several years, but it was only after the proven success of Transatlanticism that they decided to start talking to labels about a potential deal. The fact that they had already achieved considerable success allowed the band to negotiate with a lot of creative freedom. According to their manager Jordan Kurland, the band had spoken to "pretty much all of them", and then decided they were most satisfied with their offer from Atlantic Records. In November 2004, the band signed a "long-term worldwide deal" with Atlantic, leaving their long-time label Barsuk Records. Gibbard stated on the band's official website that nothing would change, except that "next to the picture of Barsuk holding a 7", there will be the letter 'A' on both the spine and back of our upcoming albums." After signing to Atlantic, the band was still nervous about corporate economics, and encouraged fans to download its songs from the Internet.

The band released their fifth studio album and debut major-label release, Plans, on August 30, 2005, to critical and commercial success. Two singles from the album, "Soul Meets Body" and "Crooked Teeth", reached the top ten of the US Billboard Alternative Songs chart, while the single "I Will Follow You into the Dark" became the band's best-selling single to date. Death Cab for Cutie performed "Crooked Teeth" live on Saturday Night Live on January 14, 2006. Plans received a nomination for the Grammy Award for Best Alternative Album of 2005, as well as achieving gold certification in 2006 after being featured on the Billboard Album chart for 47 consecutive weeks, and later was certified platinum by the Recording Industry Association of America in early May 2008.

The band released a touring DVD, Drive Well, Sleep Carefully, in 2005. Copies of the DVD were given away to promote animal rights, and the band are supporters of the activist group PETA. In early 2006, the band announced the upcoming release of Directions: The Plans Video Album, which features eleven short films inspired by songs from the Plans album, each directed by a different person. The videos were posted one at a time at the band's website, and the DVD went on sale April 11, 2006. The iTunes Store began selling the videos (formatted for iPod) early on March 28, 2006. Lance Bangs, P.R. Brown, Ace Norton, Jeffrey Brown, Lightborne, Autumn de Wilde, Rob Schrab, Laurent Briet and Monkmus, as well as Aaron Stewart-Ahn, are among directors that have contributed to the project. An episode of MTV2's Subterranean played these videos for the whole hour, plus discussion with members of the band. Death Cab for Cutie made their first appearance at Neil Young's annual Bridge School Benefit, and completed their lengthy 2006 tour of the United States on December 10, 2006, finishing with a show at the KeyArena in Seattle, Washington.

Narrow Stairs and The Open Door EP (2007–2009) 

Walla claimed on October 18, 2007, that a new album was "in full swing" and that they had six songs completed. He went on to call the new music "weird," "spectacular," and "creepy," saying that it contained "lots of blood." He noted that the album had a "Can jam" that lasted 10 minutes, which Walla said that he would have never imagined doing in 1998. In a Billboard piece in January 2008, the band promised the album to be a "curve ball" and said that although it would have slower songs, there would be some surprises. Walla said, "I'm really excited about it. It's really got some teeth. The landscape of the thing is way, way more lunar than the urban meadow sort of thing that has been happening for the last couple of records." Walla added that the album was "louder and more dissonant and ... abrasive." They claimed that they were influenced by "synth-punk band Brainiac."

Their sixth full-length album, Narrow Stairs, was released on May 12, 2008. The first single, "I Will Possess Your Heart", was released on March 18, 2008. The album version of the song is over eight minutes in length, leading radio and promotional edits to remove the extended intro to shorten the song to four minutes. The second single, "Cath...", was released on July 21, 2008, and the third single "Grapevine Fires", was released on March 3, 2009. The two singles "I Will Possess Your Heart" and "Cath..." both reached the top ten of the Alternative Songs chart, while "Grapevine Fires" reached number 21. In an album review, MTV writer James Montgomery said "Narrow Stairs is a great album, one that could make them very famous, but could very well also kill their careers," and although "Death Cab for Cutie had gone insane," he believed the LP could be "an early contender for the best album of 2008." Indeed, Narrow Stairs was nominated for "Best Alternative Music Album" and "I Will Possess Your Heart" received a nomination for "Best Rock Song" at the 51st Grammy Awards. The band lost in both categories, but prompted debate after appearing at the ceremony sporting blue ribbons to protest against what they view as the excessive use of Auto-Tune in the music industry. Narrow Stairs was their first album to reach No.1 on the Billboard 200 chart on May 31, 2008. Though the album achieved strong success, Gibbard went on to call it the band's most "depressing record".

On March 31, 2009, the band released The Open Door EP, containing tracks left off Narrow Stairs as well as a demo for "Talking Bird". The Open Door EP was nominated for Best Alternative Music Album at the 52nd Grammy Awards. In 2009 the band wrote the song, "Meet Me on the Equinox" for The Twilight Saga: New Moon soundtrack. "Meet Me on the Equinox" was not the first song that Death Cab for Cutie contributed to a soundtrack, as they contributed "Soul Meets Body" to the soundtrack for Catch and Release in 2006.

Codes and Keys (2010–2012) 

The band's seventh album, Codes and Keys, was released on May 31, 2011. Ben Gibbard and Nick Harmer have both been quoted as saying that the album was "a much less guitar-centric album than we've ever made before". The 1983 album Dazzle Ships, by English electronic band Orchestral Manoeuvres in the Dark (OMD), was a major influence on the record.

In March 2011, Ben Gibbard performed a new Death Cab for Cutie song at a solo concert in San Francisco, which would later be revealed as the title track from Codes and Keys. The track list for the album was released on Death Cab for Cutie's website on March 15, 2011.

The first single from the album, "You Are a Tourist", was released on March 29, 2011. The song's music video was their first ever live, scripted, one-take music video shoot: the group streamed a live performance of the music video as it was being recorded on April 5, 2011. The video was accomplished in a single take, using multiple cameras, and no edits or re-takes. The production employed dancers, actors, and projected images. "You Are a Tourist" was also Death Cab for Cutie's first (and to date, only) single to reach number one, topping the Billboard Alternative Songs, Adult Alternative Songs, and Bubbling Under Hot 100 Singles charts, as well as reaching number three on the Rock Songs. The band released the video for the song "Home is a Fire" on May 9, 2011, featuring street artist Shepard Fairey plastering lyrics from the song around Los Angeles. "Stay Young, Go Dancing" was released as the second single on September 26, 2011, reaching number 31 on the Alternative Songs chart. "Underneath the Sycamore" was released as the third single on January 10, 2012, but did not chart. Codes and Keys was nominated for Best Alternative Music Album at the 54th Grammy Awards in 2012.

The band was due to play at the Ottawa Bluesfest on July 17, 2011, but the outdoor stage collapsed earlier in the evening after sudden severe weather hit the area. On their website, the band posted: "Our hearts go out to those that were injured and we are so thankful that no one was killed."

In 2012, the band toured across the globe, starting in Australia, New Zealand, Southeast Asia. In April and May, the band toured in the United States with members of the Magik*Magik Orchestra, who collaborated on tracks on Codes and Keys. After headlining the inaugural Bunbury Music Festival in Cincinnati, the band played summer festivals in Europe.

Departure of Walla and Kintsugi (2013–2016) 

On October 11, 2013, they began working on their eighth studio album, produced by Rich Costey. In an interview with Stereogum, Gibbard said of the new album, "I do think from start to finish it's a much better record than Codes And Keys. If that record turned anybody off, I feel pretty strongly that this one could win them back. There are threads in this one that connect back to our earliest stuff that people love."

As part of the 2014 Record Store Day, the band released its first live album, a vinyl-only double LP recorded during various 2012 tour dates with Magik*Magik Orchestra. Included within the packaging was a code for a digital download of the recording.

On August 13, 2014, after 17 years as a member of Death Cab for Cutie, guitarist and songwriter Chris Walla decided to part ways with the band, with his last performance occurring on September 13, 2014, at the Rifflandia Music Festival in Victoria, British Columbia.  In a 2015 interview, Walla explained that he left the band because he found himself disinterested in the music they were working on for Kintsugi.  He critiqued the songs as “flat,” none of his ideas seemed to be sticking, and he felt the band needed an infusion of fresh blood; "I was really dissatisfied with where the Death Cab stuff had gotten to when I quit as producer, and that’s why I quit."  Walla plans to "continue making music, producing records, and erring on the side of benevolence and beauty whenever possible." When asked in an interview about Walla's involvement in the eighth album, McGerr confirmed that Walla "played on everything and has been involved all the way through, even in the mixing. Even though he's played his last show with us, he's still been involved in everything involving this record."

On January 12, 2015, the band officially announced the album, titled Kintsugi, which was released on March 31, 2015. Kintsugi was nominated for the Grammy Award for Best Rock Album. The band toured Kintsugi across the world through September 2016, with new touring members Dave Depper (guitar/keyboards/backing vocals) and Zac Rae (keyboards/guitar) replacing Walla. The album was the first since Gibbard's highly publicized divorce from actress Zooey Deschanel, which is believed to have been a major influence on several of the album's songs.

In October 2016, the band announced the release of a new standalone single, entitled "Million Dollar Loan". The song, intended to be a protest song against Republican Party presidential nominee Donald Trump, was released as a part of a campaign entitled 30 Days, 30 Songs , in which a previously unreleased song by a different artist was put out each day. Other artists participating in the project included Aimee Mann, who sang on Gibbard's solo album, as well as My Morning Jacket's Jim James and R.E.M. In a Facebook post about the song, Gibbard mentioned both Depper and Rae as part of the band and contributors to the writing of the song's arrangement, indicating that the two had joined the band on a full-time basis.

Kintsugi, the name of the album, means "(Noun) To repair with gold; The art of repairing metal with gold or silver lacquer and understanding that the piece is more beautiful for having been broken."

Thank You for Today and The Blue EP (2017–2020) 

On November 17, 2017, the band announced via Instagram that they had begun work on a new studio album due in 2018. On May 1, 2018, the band published a teaser video indicating an August 2018 release date. On June 12, 2018, the band announced the title of the new album, Thank You for Today, and shared the lead single from the album, "Gold Rush". Following this, on July 19, 2018, "I Dreamt We Spoke Again" was released. "Autumn Love" was the last single to be released on August 1, 2018.

The album was released on August 17, 2018. It is the band's first album without Chris Walla, and the first album to feature Depper and Rae. Lauren Mayberry was also featured on the album, contributing vocals on "Northern Lights". On August 28, 2018, the album ranked No. 1 on the Billboard Top Rock Albums and Alternative Albums charts.

On July 29, 2019, the band announced a new EP, The Blue EP, would be released on September 6, 2019. On the same day, they also released the first single from the EP, "Kids in 99", whose lyrics are loosely based on the Olympic pipeline explosion. On 16 August 2019, the EP's second single, "To The Ground" was released.

On December 2, 2020, the band announced that a Bandcamp exclusive EP titled "The Georgia E.P." would be released for 24 hours only on December 4. The album is a collection of covers by artists from Georgia. The proceeds will go to Stacey Abrams organization Fair Fight Action in honor of Georgia voting for Joe Biden in the 2020 U.S. Presidential Election, as well as the 2020–21 United States Senate election in Georgia and the 2020–21 United States Senate special election in Georgia.

Asphalt Meadows (2021–present)

The band returned to in-person live performances after 18 months in September 2021, playing shows with Perfume Genius and Deep Sea Diver. On October 29, 2021, the band shared a commemorative 20-year anniversary reissue of The Photo Album which featured studio outtakes, demos and rare recordings.

In February 2022, the band shared their first new music since the release of The Georgia E.P.: A cover of Yoko Ono's "Waiting for the Sunrise", which was recorded as part of Gibbard's curated tribute album to Ono entitled Ocean Child: Songs of Yoko Ono.

On May 5, 2022, the band confirmed that they had finished work on their tenth studio album, which was announced the following week on May 11 as being titled Asphalt Meadows, which was released on September 16. The album's lead single, "Roman Candles", was released on the same day, alongside the announcement of a North American tour with Low and Yo La Tengo.

Musical style 
Death Cab for Cutie's music has been labeled indie rock, indie pop, emo, and alternative rock. Death Cab for Cutie's early work on You Can Play These Songs with Chords was described by Rolling Stone as "emotion through its lack of emotion". Pitchfork also remarked that the work on the cassette was "ultra-lo-fi". On Something About Airplanes the band's style remained similar, with some new instrumental work introduced; "flute, synth, or cello" were noted by AllMusic's Nitsuh Abebe. On We Have the Facts and We're Voting Yes the band again expanded their use of unorthodox instruments, including organ and glockenspiel. Pitchfork called them a "gentle niche" in the current rock climate, compared with bands such as Modest Mouse and Built to Spill.

Rolling Stone reviewed Transatlanticism and commented that it contained "melodic, melancholy songs about feeling both smart and confused, hopelessly romantic but wary of love." Gibbard's voice was described as "plaintive boy-next-door" Entertainment Weekly commented on the music on Plans, saying "The lush arrangements are long on hothouse organs and pianos, but short on the squirmy guitars and squirrelly beats that, on Gibbard's best work, offset his sweet voice and borderline-maudlin poetics with a sense of emotional danger." The band's music on Plans was described by the Dallas Morning News as "a literate, whispery style, the kind of stuff that normally sounds better in headphones than in large venues".

In an interview with Shave Magazine, Ben Gibbard commented on his song writing saying that he "never sit[s] down to write an album number one. I just kind of sit down and write songs and the theme kind of makes itself apparent. But I would never say I was writing about searching for something as much as just trying to document with every song where I am in that moment when I'm writing that song. If a theme kind of makes itself apparent in a record, it has more to do with the fact that just what's been on my mind recently. So I guess clearly I have been and was and am, but it was never a conscious decision."

Band name 
Gibbard took the band name from the song "Death Cab for Cutie", which was written by Neil Innes and Vivian Stanshall and recorded by their group the Bonzo Dog Doo-Dah Band. The song is a track on the Bonzo's 1967 debut album, Gorilla, and was performed by them in the Beatles film Magical Mystery Tour. The title was originally that of a story in an old pulp fiction crime magazine that Innes came across in a street market. In a 2011 interview, Gibbard stated, "The name was never supposed to be something that someone was going to reference 15 years on. So yeah, I would absolutely go back and give it a more obvious name."

Members

Current members
 Ben Gibbard – lead vocals, guitar, piano (1997–present), bass (1997), drums, percussion (1997, 2000)
 Nick Harmer – bass (1997–present), backing vocals (2008–present), keyboards, organ (2001–2003), guitar (2011–2012)
 Jason McGerr – drums, percussion (2003–present)
 Dave Depper – guitar, keyboards, backing vocals (2016–present; touring musician 2015–2016)
 Zac Rae – keyboards, piano, guitar, backing vocals (2016–present; touring musician 2015–2016)

Former members
 Chris Walla – guitar, piano, keyboards, backing vocals (1997–2014)
 Nathan Good – drums, percussion (1997–1999)
 Jayson Tolzdorf-Larson – drums, percussion (2000)
 Michael Schorr – drums, percussion (2000–2003)

Timeline

Discography 

Studio albums
 Something About Airplanes (1998)
 We Have the Facts and We're Voting Yes (2000)
 The Photo Album (2001)
 Transatlanticism (2003)
 Plans (2005)
 Narrow Stairs (2008)
 Codes and Keys (2011)
 Kintsugi (2015)
 Thank You for Today (2018)
 Asphalt Meadows (2022)

Awards and nominations 
Grammy Award

|-
| 2006
| Plans 
| Best Alternative Music Album 
| 
|-
|rowspan="2"| 2007
| Directions
| Best Long Form Music Video
| 
|-
| "I Will Follow You into the Dark"
| Best Pop Performance by a Duo or Group with Vocals
|  
|-
|rowspan="2"| 2009
| "I Will Possess Your Heart" 
| Best Rock Song
| 
|-
| Narrow Stairs
|rowspan="3"| Best Alternative Music Album
|  
|-
| 2010
| The Open Door EP 
| 
|-
| 2012
| Codes and Keys 
|  
|-
| 2016
| Kintsugi 
| Best Rock Album
|  
|}

MTV Video Music Award

|-
|rowspan="2"| 2008
|rowspan="2"| "I Will Possess Your Heart" 
| Best Editing (Editor: Aaron Stewart-Ahn and Jeff Buchanan)
| 
|-
| Best Cinematography (Director of Photography: Aaron Stewart-Ahn and Shawn Kim)
| 
|-
| 2009
| "Grapevine Fires"
| Breakthrough Video
| 
|-
| 2011
| "You Are a Tourist"
| Best Art Direction (Art Director: Nick Gould, Tim Nackashi and Anthony Maitz)
| 
|}

References

External links

Death Cab for Cutie at the Internet Archive's Live Music Archive
 

 
Alternative rock groups from Washington (state)
Atlantic Records artists
Barsuk Records artists
Indie pop groups from Washington (state)
Indie rock musical groups from Washington (state)
Musical groups established in 1997
1997 establishments in Washington (state)
Fierce Panda Records artists
Sub Pop artists
American emo musical groups
Grand Hotel van Cleef Records artists